Makwa Lake 129A is an Indian reserve of the Makwa Sahgaiehcan First Nation in Saskatchewan. It is 95 miles northwest of North Battleford.

References

Indian reserves in Saskatchewan
Division No. 17, Saskatchewan